Czerwonka  is a village in the administrative district of Gmina Biskupiec, within Olsztyn County, Warmian-Masurian Voivodeship, in northern Poland.

The village has a population of 1,090.

References

Czerwonka